Anna Vladimirovna Chicherova (born 22 July 1982) is a Russian high jumper. She was the gold medalist at the 2012 London Olympics and the 2011 World Championships in Athletics and was originally awarded a bronze medal in the event at the 2008 Summer Olympics, which was later stripped for doping. She was also runner-up at the World Championships in 2007 and 2013, as well as the bronze medalist in 2015.

In May 2016, it was reported that a retest of samples from the 2008 Games had found 31 positive findings for performance-enhancing drugs. One of those positive tests was admitted by her coach to belong to Chicherova. On 6 October 2016, the IOC confirmed that Chicherova had failed a doping test, due to the presence of turinabol in her 2008 sample, and stripped her of her bronze medal. The medal was ultimately reallocated to original 6th place finisher Chaunte Lowe, as the 4th and 5th place high jumpers in that final tested positive for their retests as well. Chicherova's World Championship silver medal was later stripped. 

On 23 July 2018, the day after returning to a national competition to jump 1.90 m, the permission was granted, and Chicherova asked the IAAF to be able to participate in the 2018 European Athletics Championships.

At the beginning of 2019, she jumped 2.01 indoors twice, three days apart. At age 36, those jumps both equalled the Masters W35 World Record, though because they were indoors, they will not be recognized as the record.

In September 2019, Chicherova along with Elena Lashmanova was refused clearance for the IAAF World Athletics Championships.

Biography
Chicherova was born in Yerevan and then moved to Belaya Kalitva, Russia, when the Soviet Union dissolved. She previously announced that she would retire after the 2013 World Championships in Moscow, after 14 years at the top, but has since continued to jump. After her second world silver in 2009, Chicherova announced her retirement, but after giving birth in 2010, she made her come back in 2011.

In 1999, she won her first major title when she was only 16, at the world youth championships in Bydgoszcz.
Chicherova was among the world leading high jumpers for several years until she missed the 2010 season due to pregnancy. After returning in 2011 she established herself as the world leading female high jumper displacing Blanka Vlašić. Her personal best jump and the Russian national record is 2.07 metres, achieved on her 29th birthday at the Russian track and field championships of 2011. Her best indoors was achieved at the Hochsprung mit Musik meeting 2012 in Arnstadt with 2.06 m. She thereby improved her Russian indoor national record by two centimeters. Chicherova is among the top ten high jumpers of all time both indoor and outdoor.

Chicherova is currently in the athletics club based in Moscow, where she is coached by Yevgeni Zagorulko. She is married to Gennadiy Chernovol. She was absent for the 2010 season due to pregnancy and had her first child, Nika, in September that year.

With her victories in Daegu and London, Chicherova became only the third female high jumper in history (after Stefka Kostadinova & Heike Henkel) to win gold at both the Olympic Games and the World Championships.

Achievements

Personal bests

Six-time Russian National High Jump Champion – 2004, 2007–2009, 2011–2012

See also
List of doping cases in athletics

References

External links
Russian Athletics Association Profile

Living people
1982 births
Sportspeople from Yerevan
Russian female high jumpers
Olympic female high jumpers
Olympic athletes of Russia
Olympic gold medalists for Russia
Olympic gold medalists in athletics (track and field)
Athletes (track and field) at the 2004 Summer Olympics
Athletes (track and field) at the 2008 Summer Olympics
Athletes (track and field) at the 2012 Summer Olympics
Medalists at the 2012 Summer Olympics
Competitors stripped of Summer Olympics medals
Universiade gold medalists in athletics (track and field)
Universiade gold medalists for Russia
Medalists at the 2005 Summer Universiade
World Athletics Championships athletes for Russia
World Athletics Championships medalists
World Athletics Championships winners
World Youth Championships in Athletics winners
European Athletics Indoor Championships winners
Russian Athletics Championships winners
Doping cases in athletics
Russian sportspeople in doping cases